Thomas Stewardson (August 1781 – 1859) was a British portrait painter.

Stewardson was born at Kendal in August 1781, the son of John and Anne Stewardson, who were from a Quaker family at Ullsmoor, near Shap in Westmoreland.

He is buried at Kensal Green Cemetery, London.

Literary references

Letitia Elizabeth Landon produced the poem Portrait of a Girl, in the British Gallery, by T. Stewardson as part of her Poetical Catalogue of Pictures in the Literary gazette, 1823. This is probably Stewardson's Portrait of a Girl (traditionally identified as Lady Catherine Powlett, Countess of Darlington).

References

External links
 

1781 births
1859 deaths
Burials at Kensal Green Cemetery
British Quakers
People from Kendal
British portrait painters